The term Horse goddess may refer to one of several mythological goddesses:

Epona, the horse goddess in Celtic and Gallo-Roman mythology
Rhiannon, the horse goddess in Welsh mythology
Étaín, identified as a horse goddess in some versions of Irish Mythology
Gontia (deity), a Celtic goddess